Olius is a municipality in the comarca of the Solsonès in Catalonia, Spain. It is situated on the Cardener river above the reservoir of Sant Ponç. The village is served by the C-149 road between Solsona and Berga. The church of Sant Esteve d'Olius is a protected historico-artistic monument.

Subdivisions 
The municipality of Olius is formed of four villages. Populations are given as of 2005:
Brics (64)
El Castellvell (38)
Olius (118)
El Pi de Sant Just (395)
The municipality surrounds Solsona except to the north, and includes a small exclave within Solsona.

Demography

References

 Panareda Clopés, Josep Maria; Rios Calvet, Jaume; Rabella Vives, Josep Maria (1989). Guia de Catalunya, Barcelona: Caixa de Catalunya.  (Spanish).  (Catalan).

External links
Official website 
 Government data pages 

Municipalities in Solsonès
Populated places in Solsonès